Jonathan Rodríguez Cuenú (born November 7, 1986) is a Colombian footballer who currently plays for the Bolivian club La Paz.

See also
Football in Colombia
List of football clubs in Colombia

References

External links
Profile at BDFA 

1986 births
Living people
Colombian footballers
Atlético Huila footballers
C.D. FAS footballers
Alianza Atlético footballers
La Paz F.C. players
Colombian expatriate footballers
Expatriate footballers in El Salvador
Expatriate footballers in Peru
Expatriate footballers in Bolivia
Association football forwards
Sportspeople from Valle del Cauca Department